A hydrogen turboexpander-generator or generator loaded expander for hydrogen gas is an axial flow turbine or radial expander for energy recovery through which a high pressure hydrogen gas is expanded to produce work that is used to drive an electrical generator. It replaces the control valve or regulator where the pressure drops to the appropriate pressure for the low pressure network. A turboexpander-generator can help recover energy losses and offset electrical requirements and  emissions.

Description
Per stage 200 bar is handled with up to 15,000 kW power and a maximum expansion ratio of 14, the generator loaded expander for hydrogen gas is fitted with automatic thrust balance, a dry gas seal and a programmable logic control with remote monitoring and diagnostics.

Application
The hydrogen turboexpander-generators are used for hydrogen pipeline transport in combination with hydrogen compressors and for the recovery of energy in underground hydrogen storage. A variation are the compressor loaded turboexpanders which are used in the liquefaction of gases such as liquid hydrogen

See also
compressed hydrogen
letdown station
hydrogen infrastructure
turboexpander

References

External links
A preliminary inventory of the potential for electricity generation-2005

Hydrogen technologies
Mechanical engineering
Turbines
Electrical generators
Energy recovery